The 1983 Virginia Slims of Kansas was a women's tennis tournament played on outdoor hard courts in Kansas City, Kansas in the United States that was part of the Ginny Tournament Circuit of the 1983 Virginia Slims World Championship Series. It was the fifth edition of the tournament and was held from September 19 through September 25, 1983. Elizabeth Sayers won the singles title.

Finals

Singles
 Elizabeth Sayers defeated  Anne Minter 6–3, 6–1
 It was Sayers' 1st singles title of the year and the 2nd of her career.

Doubles
 Sandy Collins /  Elizabeth Sayers defeated  Chris O'Neil /  Brenda Remilton 7–5, 7–7
 It was Collins' 1st career title. It was Smylie's 3rd title of the year and the 4th of her career.

Notes

References

External links
 ITF tournament edition details

Virginia Slims of Kansas
Virginia Slims of Kansas
Virginia Slims of Kansas
Virginia Slims of Kansas
Virginia Slims of Kansas